The National Children's Orchestras of Great Britain, more commonly known as NCO, is a registered charity which provides orchestral training for children aged 7 to 14.  The organisation comprises five age-banded orchestras and six regional orchestras.  Entry is by audition and every year approximately 500  young musicians are selected to play in the orchestras.  It offers a life-changing experience to talented young musicians.

About the NCO 
The NCO was founded in 1978 by Vivienne Price MBE.  Price, a violin teacher, had set up a number of local orchestras for children in Surrey but was acutely aware of the lack of national opportunities for younger musicians.  The National Youth Orchestra of Great Britain had existed since 1948 and there were many regional youth orchestras which catered for teenagers, but younger children struggled to fit in socially and so Price established the NCO.

The Orchestras 

There are six age-banded orchestras:
Main Orchestra 
Under 13 Orchestra 
Under 12 Orchestra 
Under 11 Orchestra 
Under 10 Orchestra
Training Orchestra

Regional Orchestras 

In addition to the age-banded orchestras, there are six regional orchestras:
 

Regional Orchestra rehearsals are optional for members and include children across the full age range.  In 2012, the organisation introduced an associate member scheme across all of their Regional Orchestras which gives talented youngsters who just missed out on an NCO place a chance to experience playing as part of a full symphony orchestra and to learn from members.  Regional Orchestra members meet monthly during term time and give members additional opportunities to meet and rehearse new repertoire. Typically, each Regional Orchestra rehearses at a school or centre which is easily accessible and can provide facilities to accommodate a full symphony orchestra. Each Regional Orchestra performs for family and friends once a year.

Courses 
Each orchestra meets once or twice a year at residential courses around the UK, where they receive training from leading music tutors and conductors.  Main and Under 13 Orchestras have a nine-day course in the spring and another nine-day course in the summer, ending in a public concert in a major venue, as well as a non-residential winter weekend. the Under 12 Orchestra has 2 courses a year with one public concert and one for friends and family.  The younger orchestras (Under 11's, 10's and Training Orchestra) have an eight-day course in the summer, ending in a concert for friends and family.  The courses are spent in sectionals and full orchestral rehearsals, preparing repertoire to be played at the end of course concert.  There is also time to explore other music and for recreation.

Concerts
Each course culminates in a concert.  The younger orchestras perform for family and friends, while Main and Under 13 Orchestras perform in public at major concert venues.  Performances have been given at Symphony Hall, Birmingham, Royal Albert Hall, Bridgewater Hall, Southbank Centre, The Sage Gateshead, Colston Hall, St David's Hall, Leeds Town Hall, Birmingham Town Hall, The Anvil, Basingstoke, Brighton Dome, Barbican Centre and Nottingham Royal Concert Hall.

Repertoire for the concerts is varied and includes Classical, Romantic, 20th and 21st century music, as well as film scores.  The NCO has commissioned, premiered and played new pieces by contemporary composers such as Matthew Curtis and Stephen Frost.  The Orchestras have a reputation for tackling challenging repertoire. , recent performances had included Gershwin's Rhapsody in Blue and La Valse by Ravel (both performed by Main Orchestra) and Der Rosenkavalier Suite by Richard Strauss and Curtis' Paths to Urbino (performed by the U13 Orchestra).

Tours 
The NCO has been on tour, to Italy in 2008 when Lady Susanna Walton (widow of Sir William Walton) invited Main Orchestra to play in the Walton's open-air theatre within the botanical gardens of La Mortella on the island of Ischia.  They also played a concert to a packed audience in the Basilica di Santa Maria sopra Minerva in Rome.

In 2006 Main Orchestra toured to China where they took part in the International Festival of Music in Beijing.  They performed in the Forbidden City Concert Hall and at the University of Beijing.

Alumni
After leaving the NCO many musicians continue to pursue other musical opportunities.  Typically, over half of the NYO players have previously been members of the NCO (86 out of 156 in 2010).  The BBC Young Musician of the Year 2010 competition featured 25 category finalists, 13 of whom had progressed through the NCO.

Many alumni become professional musicians, some playing for leading orchestras and ensembles.  As well as those who build successful careers as professional musicians, many other NCO alumni go on to excel in other fields – medicine, law and engineering among others.

Notable alumni

See also 
 List of youth orchestras

References

External links
 National Children's Orchestras of Great Britain

British orchestras
National youth orchestras
British youth orchestras
Youth orchestras
1978 establishments in the United Kingdom
Musical groups established in 1978
Children's charities based in the United Kingdom